Crenicichla hummelincki is a species of cichlid native to South America. It is found in the upper Trombetas River basin of the Amazon River basin in Brazil.

The fish is named in honor of zoologist Pieter Wagenaar Hummelinck (1907-2003), the founder of the Foundation for Scientific Research in Suriname and the Netherlands Antilles, on the occasion of his 83rd birthday.

References

hummelincki
Freshwater fish of Brazil
Fish of the Amazon basin
Taxa named by Alex Ploeg
Fish described in 1991